GES or Gęś may refer to:

People 
 Grigory Ges (1916–1978), Soviet aviator

Places 
 Gęś, Lublin Voivodeship
 Gęś, Pomeranian Voivodeship

Other uses 
 Geneva English School
 GES (band), a Swedish supergroup
 Germanium monosulfide (GeS)
 Global Economic Symposium, annual conference in Germany
 Good Environmental Status of the EU's Marine Strategy Framework Directive
 Government Economic Service, UK
 Grace Evangelical Society, US
 G♭ (musical note)

See also 
 GE (disambiguation)
 Gess (disambiguation)